Esmail Bazar Mahrek Jamik (also Romanized as Esmāʿīl Bāzār Mahrek Jamīk) is a village in Bahu Kalat Rural District, Dashtiari District, Chabahar County, Sistan and Baluchestan Province, Iran. At the 2006 census, its population was 123, in 27 families.

References 

Populated places in Chabahar County